Martha Black (born 1945) is a Canadian art historian who specializes in Northwest Coast art and issues in museum management and repatriation. Black is the author or a number of articles and a book on Heiltsuk and Nuu Chah Nuulth art, and issues related to repatriation outside of the treaty process. She is a curator at the Royal British Columbia Museum.

Biography 
Black received her MA in interdisciplinary studies from York University, Toronto and a PhD in art history from the University of Victoria, both focused on Heiltsuk art and museum collections. Black has worked with the Heiltsuk community, both in her research and in the collaborative museum exhibit Kaxlaya Gvilas at the Royal Ontario Museum. As she says:
"The Royal Ontario Museum holds a major but little-known collection of Northwest coast native art and artifacts acquired by the Reverend Dr. Richard Whitfield Large at Bella Bella, British Columbia between 1899 and 1906. Although the R. W. Large Collection is one of the most important Heiltsuk collections in existence because of its unique documentation, there had never been a comprehensive study of it". Black undertook a study of the collection in her book "Bella Bella: A Season of Heiltsuk Art" and worked with the Heiltsuk to produce an art exhibit based on the collection with a number of contemporary pieces. She described the collection gathered in Bella Bella by the Missionary doctor R. W. Large. The collection, unusual for its associated information allowed Black to provide biological information about five named Heiltsuk artists.
 
The exhibit Kaxlaya Gvi'ilas was a partnership between the Heiltsuk, the Museum of Anthropology (UBC), the Royal Ontario Museum, and Black. A collaborative exhibit, it contained a combination of historical works from the Royal Ontario Museum's R.W. Large Collection and contemporary artwork from the Heiltsuk village of Waglisla (Bella Bella). The exhibit traveled after its initial showing in the Royal Ontario Museum, to Vancouver (MOA 2002), Montreal (McCord Museum MGill) and Owen Sound Ontario.

Black has curated a number of exhibitions at the Royal BC Museum, including Nłuut’iksa Łagigyedm Ts’msyeen: Treasures of the Tsimshian from the Dundas Collection (2007), Huupukwanum · Tupaat: Out of the Mist, Treasures of the Nuu-chah-nulth Chiefs (1999), Nisga’a: People of the Nass River (2001) and Argillite: A Haida Art (2001), and was co-curator of the Royal Ontario Museum’s travelling exhibition, Kaxlaya Gvilas: "the ones who uphold the laws of our ancestors" (2000).

See also
Heiltsuk
Northwest Coast art
Royal Ontario Museum

References

Works
 Black, Martha. Bella Bella: A Season of Heiltsuk Art. Royal Ontario Museum. 1997. 
 Black, Martha. Out of the Mist: Treasures of the Nuu-chah-nuulth Chiefs. 1999. 

Living people
Canadian art historians
Place of birth missing (living people)
Women art historians
Canadian women curators
1945 births